Liza Lapira (born December 3, 1981) is an American actress. She played Kianna in the 2008 film 21, Special Agent Michelle Lee in the CBS police procedural series NCIS and Ivy, Topher Brink's assistant in Dollhouse.
Lapira has also co-starred in the short-lived sitcoms Traffic Light, Don't Trust the B---- in Apartment 23, Super Fun Night and 9JKL. As of 2021, she currently stars in CBS's The Equalizer.

Personal life
Lapira was born in Queens, New York. She is of Filipino, Spanish, and Chinese ancestry.
In New York, she acted on stage and in independent films. She moved to Los Angeles in 2004 to work in television. Lapira is an avid supporter of LA's Best, which provides after school services to 28,000 children in 189 schools in the neighborhoods with the highest needs around Los Angeles. Also, she participates in the Children's Hospital Los Angeles Charity Triathlon each fall in Malibu. Currently, she is working with The Impact Theatre in Harlem, while living on the east coast.

Career

Stage
Lapira's New York stage credits include As You Like It, The School for Wives, The Odyssey, and Alexandra Cunningham's No. 11 Blue and White. Most recently, she played Suzanne in Steve Martin’s Picasso at the Lapin Agile at the Old Globe Theatre in San Diego.

Film
Early film credits include director Tony Scott's Domino and independent feature The Big Bad Swim, which premiered at the Tribeca Film Festival in 2006. Lapira appeared in J. J. Abrams' 2008 film Cloverfield as Heather and also appeared in Table for Three and 21. In 2009, she played Agent Sophie Trinh in the film Fast & Furious opposite Paul Walker, and in 2010, she played Alva in Repo Men. She portrayed Liz, the sharp-tongued friend of Hannah (Emma Stone) in the 2011 film Crazy, Stupid, Love. In 2021, she played Teresa in Dante Basco's directorial debut The Fabulous Filipino Brothers.

Television
Lapira's first major role was a series regular spot on the Showtime TV series Huff. Lapira played neuroscientist Ivy in both seasons of Joss Whedon's series Dollhouse, appearing predominantly with Fran Kranz and Dichen Lachman.

Her TV credits include recurring roles in Dexter, ER, Monk, Grey's Anatomy, Law & Order: Special Victims Unit, The Parkers as Shaquan, Sex and the City, and The Sopranos.

Lapira had regular roles as: Agent Michelle Lee in NCIS, Lisa in Traffic Light, Robin in Don't Trust the B---- in Apartment 23, Detective Jacocks in Battle Creek, Leslie Barrett in Cooper Barrett's Guide to Surviving Life, and Eve in the CBS comedy 9JKL.

In August 2018, Lapira joined the recurring cast of the Netflix limited-series Unbelievable.

In 2020, Lapira was cast as a lead on CBS' The Equalizer reboot opposite Queen Latifah and Chris Noth.

Filmography

References

External links

1981 births
20th-century American actresses
21st-century American actresses
Actresses from New York City
American actresses of Chinese descent
American film actresses
American actresses of Filipino descent
American stage actresses
American television actresses
Living people
People from Queens, New York